The Fifth Amendment to the Constitution of Bangladesh inserted "In the name of Allah, the Beneficent, the Merciful" at the beginning of the constitution and validated all laws made by military rulers following the 15 August 1975 Bangladesh coup d'état. It was passed in 1979 under a parliament led by President Ziaur Rahman. The amendment fundamentally altered the nature of the constitution of Bangladesh. The amendment was declared illegal in a verdict of the Supreme Court in 2010. The Fifteen Amendment to the Constitution of Bangladesh, passed in 2011, restored secularism.

Background 
President Sheikh Mujibur Rahman was killed in the 15 August 1975 Bangladesh coup d'état and his government replaced by a military one. The second parliament was formed in 1979 led by President General Ziaur Rahman which passed the 5th amendment. After the coup, the new president, Khondaker Mostaq Ahmad, repealed the Bangladesh Collaborators (Special Tribunal) Order 1972 which allowed for the trial of war criminals of the Bangladesh Liberation War. Later, President Justice Abu Sadat Mohammad Sayem removed the provision that banned religion based politics. President Ziaur Rahman removed the ban on convicted war criminals becoming voters and becoming members of parliament. The coup regimes lasted from 15 August 1975 to 6 April 1979 during which the country was under martial law. The amendment was passed on 9 April 1979.

Content 

 It removed "Bangalee nationalism" and replaced it with "Bangladeshi nationalism" in the constitution.
 It removed the ban on religion based politics and allowed the registration of those parties.
 It removed secularism from the constitution and added "absolute trust and faith in Almighty Allah" before the preamble to the constitution.
 It redefined the word socialism in the constitution be adding a new meaning "socialism would mean economic and social justice".
 It removed Socialism and freedom from exploitation added increasing local government and increasing the participation of women.
 It legalised all the decisions of the military regimes formed after the 1975 coups.
 It made the Indemnity Act law, which provided immunity to the army officers who killed President Sheikh Mujibur Rahman and most of his family in the 1975 coup.

History 
After the 15 August 1975 Bangladesh coup d'état Moon Cinema Hall in old Dhaka was nationalised and handed over to the Bangladesh Muktijoddha Kalyan Trust. The owners filed suit in Bangladesh Italian Marble Works Ltd. v. Government of Bangladesh. On 29 August 2005, Bangladesh High Court declared the 5th amendment illegal; the verdict was upheld by Bangladesh Supreme Court with some exceptions on 2 February 2010. Moudud Ahmed, former Prime Minister of Bangladesh, told the court the 5th amendment was necessary and that it had been accepted by everyone.

On 18 December 2019, Bangladesh Muktijoddha Kalyan Trust handed 1 billion taka to the owner, Maqsudul Alam, as compensation for the nationalisation of his company.

References 

05